The ShopRite LPGA Classic, known in full for sponsorship reasons as The ShopRite LPGA Classic Presented by Acer, is a women's professional golf tournament on the LPGA Tour in Galloway, New Jersey, near Atlantic City.  It took place annually from 1986 through 2006 and returned to the tour schedule in 2010 at the Bay Course at the Dolce Seaview Resort, with a prize fund of $1.75 million. Purchased in September 2010, the resort is now known as Seaview, A Dolce Hotel.

History
From 1986 through 2006, the tournament was played at two different courses near Atlantic City, with the first two and last nine years played on the Bay Course of the Seaview Marriott Resort. It was a 54-hole tournament played over three days, except for 1990 when it was a four-day, 72-hole event. For a decade (1988–97), the event was played at Greate Bay Country Club in Somers Point, known as Sands Country Club until 1991.

The tournament was originally known as the Atlantic City LPGA Classic. Its name was changed in 1992 to the ShopRite LPGA Classic when Wakefern Food Corporation took over as the sponsor.

In 2013, Acer, a Taiwanese computer hardware and electronics company, was added as a presenting sponsor.

Starting in the 2007 season, the LPGA decided to use the traditional ShopRite Classic dates in early June for a new tournament, the Ginn Tribute Hosted by Annika.  After being unable to agree with the LPGA on new dates, the owners decided to end the tournament. ShopRite retained a presence on the LPGA Tour in 2007 as the presenting sponsor of the Sybase Classic. Under the leadership of Eiger Marketing Group in 2009, the LPGA Tour announced that the ShopRite LPGA Classic would return to the schedule in 2010, as a three-day tournament to be played at the same course. The resort on which the course sits was renamed the Dolce Seaview Resort in 2009 after Dolce Hotels took over management from Marriott. Following the purchase by the Richard Stockton College of New Jersey for $20 million in September 2010, it was renamed the Stockton Seaview Hotel and Golf Club. The name of property was changed to Seaview, A Dolce Hotel, when it was purchased by KDG Capital LLC in July 2018.

Multiple winners of the event are Betsy King (1987, 1995, 2001), Annika Sörenstam (1998, 2002, 2005), Juli Inkster (1986, 1988), Stacy Lewis (2012, 2014) and Anna Nordqvist (2015, 2016). There have been two playoffs, in 1988 and 1992.

Tournament names
1986–1987: Atlantic City LPGA Classic
1988–1991: Atlantic City Classic
1992–2012: ShopRite LPGA Classic (not held 2007–09)
2013–present: ShopRite LPGA Classic Presented by Acer

Course

Bay Course

Source:

The Bay Course was designed  in 1914 by Donald Ross and hosted the PGA Championship in 1942, the first of seven majors won by Sam Snead.

Winners

Source:
Note: Green highlight indicates scoring records.

Tournament record

References

External links

Coverage on LPGA Tour's official site
Stockton Seaview Hotel and Golf Club
Greate Bay Country Club

LPGA Tour events
Golf in New Jersey
Recurring sporting events established in 1986
1986 establishments in New Jersey